The Bunsen cell is a zinc-carbon primary cell (colloquially called a "battery") composed of a zinc anode in dilute sulfuric acid separated by a porous pot from a carbon cathode in nitric or chromic acid.

Cell details 

The Bunsen cell is about 1.9 volts and arises from the following reaction:

 Zn + H2SO4 + 2 HNO3  ZnSO4 + 2 H2O + 2 NO2(g)

According to the reaction above, when 1 mole (or part) each of zinc and sulfuric acid react with 2 moles (or parts) of nitric acid, the resultant products formed are, 1 mole (or part) of zinc sulfate and 2 moles (or parts) each of water and nitrogen dioxide (gaseous, in the form of bubbles). 

The cell is named after its inventor, German chemist Robert Wilhelm Bunsen, who improved upon the Grove cell by replacing Grove's expensive platinum cathode with carbon in the form of pulverized coal and coke. Like Grove's battery, Bunsen's emitted noxious fumes of nitrogen dioxide.

Bunsen used this cell to extract metals. Henri Moissan used a stack of 90 cells for the electrolysis of hydrogen fluoride to obtain fluorine for the first time.

See also
 History of the battery
 List of battery types
 Battery nomenclature

References

Further reading

External links

Bunsen "Battery"

Battery types

fr:Pile électrique#Piles à dépolarisation